Ana María Estupiñán García (born April 7, 1992 in Bogotá, Colombia), is a Colombian actress and singer.

Biography 

Ana María Estupiñán is the daughter of Juan Carlos Estupiñán and Liliana García. Since childhood she has participated in the entertainment trade with her siblings Laura and Felipe Estupiñán. At the age of 12, she began her theater career by entering the academy of Caracol. Ana Maria is married. She was involved in her church youth group from an early age.

Filmography

Awards and nominations

Premios India Catalina

Premios TVyNovelas

Kids Choice Awards Colombia

Kids Choice Awards México

References

External links 
 

21st-century Colombian women singers
Colombian telenovela actresses
Living people
1992 births
People from Bogotá